Acrotriche is a  genus of flowering plants in the family Ericaceae. Species occur in all states of Australia. They include:

Acrotriche affinis DC. - Ridged ground-berry
Acrotriche aggregata R.Br. - Red cluster heath, tall groundberry or tall acrotriche
Acrotriche baileyana (Domin) J.M.Powell 
Acrotriche cordata (Labill.) R.Br. - Coast ground-berry
Acrotriche depressa R.Br. - Wiry ground-berry
Acrotriche divaricata R.Br. 
Acrotriche dura (Benth.) Quinn
Acrotriche fasciculiflora (Regel) Benth. 
Acrotriche halmaturina B.R.Paterson 
Acrotriche leucocarpa Jobson & Whiffin - Tall acrotriche
Acrotriche patula R.Br.
Acrotriche plurilocularis Jackes 
Acrotriche prostrata F.Muell. - Trailing ground-berry  
Acrotriche ramiflora R.Br.  
Acrotriche rigida B.R.Paterson 
Acrotriche serrulata R.Br. - Honeypots

References

 
Ericales of Australia
Ericaceae genera